Heroes or Ghosts is the debut album by the Irish indie act The Coronas, released in October 2007 by 3ú Records and published by Little Rox Music.  An Irish language version of the titular song was also recorded called "Taibhsí nó Laoich".

Track listing
All tracks written by Danny O'Reilly and arranged by The Coronas except where stated.

"Grace, Don't Wait!" – 3:26 Lyrics by McPhillips/O'Reilly
"Make a Change" – 3:41
"San Diego Song" – 2:51
"Heroes or Ghosts" – 4:34 Lyrics by McPhillips/O'Reilly
"The Talk" – 3:56
"The Great Divide" – 3:28 Music O'Reilly/Egan/Knox; Lyrics by O'Reilly
"I Choose Love" – 4:24
"Decision Time" – 3:29
"Filtho" – 2:49
"Real World" – 3:44
"The Joker" – 10:14
 Contains the hidden track "Temporary Release" at 5:49

2007 debut albums
The Coronas albums